The 1936 National Challenge Cup was the annual open cup held by the United States Football Association now known as the Lamar Hunt U.S. Open Cup. This edition featured the fifth of six consecutive final appearances for Alex McNab's team. The Shamrocks not participating in their local league that year were playing inter city matches with top competition primarily from Cleveland, Chicago and Detroit. One of their only losses during the season was to Heidelberg, eventual Western Final opponents of the Shamrocks. Early in the season Heidelberg took the first game of a three-game set, the second match ended in a draw and McNab's men evened up the series by pulling out a victory in the third game. Both teams eventually made their way to the Western Final, Heidelberg led by the lone scorer for the USA at the 1934 World Cup Aldo Donelli. The Shamrocks with their World Cup veterans including William Lehman, Billy Gonsalves, Werner Nilsen, and Bert Patenaude overcame the Pennsylvanians with a 3-2 aggregate over two games. The final showcased still further US nationals. The Philadelphia German-Americans roster boasted a quartet of their own including Bill Fiedler, Al Harker, Peter Pietras, and Francis Ryan. After a two all draw in the first leg of the final in St. Louis, Philly took home the trophy by blanking the Shamrocks 3–0 in the second leg.

Eastern Division

Western Division

a) aggregate after three games

Final

First game

Second game

Sources
St. Louis Post-Dispatch

U.S. Open Cup
Nat